Waukee is a city in Dallas County, Iowa, United States. The population was 23,940 at the time of the 2020 U.S. Census. It is part of the Des Moines – West Des Moines Metropolitan Statistical Area.

In 2017, Apple Inc. chose Waukee as the location of a massive $1.38 billion data center campus.

History
Waukee was laid out as a town in 1869. It is thought to be named after the Chicago, Milwaukee, St. Paul & Pacific Railroad (often referred to as the Milwaukee Road). Waukee was incorporated on December 23, 1878.

Geography
Waukee is located at  (41.608974, -93.865320).
It is known for its Waukee Stadium.

Climate
Humid continental climate is a climatic region typified by large seasonal temperature differences, with warm to hot (and often humid) summers and cold (sometimes severely cold) winters. The Köppen climate classification subtype for this climate is "Dfa" (Hot summer, continental climate).

Education

The Waukee Community School District is the fastest-growing school district in the state of Iowa with more than 1,000 staff members serving more than 7,700 students in grades preschool through twelfth grade.

Its schools serve students from Clive, Urbandale, Waukee, and West Des Moines as well as open enrollment students from other communities outside the 55 square miles of its district boundaries.

There are currently nine elementary schools, two middle schools (grades 6/7), and two middle schools (grades 8/9) in Waukee as well as the Waukee High School and the Vincent Meyer Learning Center.

The district built a second high school, called Waukee Northwest High School, which opened in the 2021 school year.

Demographics

2010 U.S. Census
As of the 2010 United States Census, there were 13,790 people, 5,154 households, and 3,689 families living in the city. The racial makeup of the city was 93.9% white, 1.3% African American, 0.2% Native American, 2.6% Asian, 0.1% Pacific Islander, 0.9% from other races and 1.1% from two or more races. Hispanic or Latino of any race were 3.0% of the population.

There were 5,154 households, of which 44.8% had children under the age of 18 living with them, 59.0% were married couples living together, 9.3% had a female householder with no husband present, 3.3% had a male householder with no wife present, and 28.4% were non-families. 23.0% of all households were made up of individuals, and 6.7% had someone living alone who was 65 years of age or older. The average household size was 2.67 and the average family size was 3.19.

The median age in the city was 31.8 years. 32% of residents were under the age of 18; 5.1% were between the ages of 18 and 24; 36.3% were from 25 to 44; 18.5% were from 45 to 64; and 8% were 65 years of age or older. The gender makeup of the city was 48.6% male and 51.4% female.

2000 U.S. Census
As of the 2000 United States Census, there were 5,126 people, 1,927 households, and 1,445 families living in the city. The racial makeup of the city was 98.17% white, 0.43% African American, 0.57% Asian, 0.02% Pacific Islander, 0.31% from other races and 0.51% from two or more races. Hispanic or Latino of any race were 0.74% of the population.

There were 1,927 households, out of which 43.0% had children under the age of 18 living with them, 64.8% were married couples living together, 8.2% had a female householder with no husband present, and 25.0% were non-families. 21.1% of all households were made up of individuals, and 6.7% had someone living alone who was 65 years of age or older. The average household size was 2.66 and the average family size was 3.12.

In the city, the population was spread out, with 30.4% under the age of 18, 5.5% from 18 to 24, 36.4% from 25 to 44, 19.9% from 45 to 64, and 7.6% who were 65 years of age or older. The median age was 33 years. For every 100 females, there were 98.0 males. For every 100 females age 18 and over, there were 91.1 males.

The median income for a household in the city was $58,024, and the median income for a family was $64,362. Males had a median income of $38,958 and females had a median income of $30,898. The per capita income for the city was $24,351. About 2.1% of families and 3.0% of the population were below the poverty line, including 3.5% of those under age 18 and 6.6% of those age 65 or over.

Notable people

Paul Gregory — film, Television and stage producer
Joey Jordison — former drummer for the band Slipknot
Jake Knott — former Iowa State and Philadelphia Eagles linebacker
Anthony Nelson - former Iowa and current Tampa Bay Buccaneers linebacker
Talia Leman — CEO and a founder of RandomKid, an organization that empowers young people to do good deeds
Hal Manders — relief pitcher in Major League Baseball; born in Waukee 
Ken Smith — internationally acclaimed landscape architect; born in Waukee

See also

 Raccoon River Valley Trail

References

External links

City of Waukee, Iowa Website
Chamber of commerce
Waukee Community School District
City-Data Comprehensive Statistical Data and more about Waukee
ePodunk:Profile for Waukee, Iowa, IA
Waukee 2nd High School Project

Cities in Iowa
Cities in Dallas County, Iowa
Des Moines metropolitan area
1869 establishments in Iowa
Populated places established in 1869